Sally Smith is the name of:

Sally Smith, the slave name of the West-African woman Redoshi (d. 1937)
Sally Smith (actress) (born 1942), British actress
Sally Smith (politician) (born 1945), American politician
Sally Bedell Smith (born 1948), American historian and author
Sally E. Smith, Australian mycologist 
Sally J. Smith, American businesswoman
Sally J. Smith, American artist
Sally Liberman Smith (1929–2007), American educator
Sally Merchant (1919–2007), née Smith, Canadian television personality and political figure
Sally James (presenter) (born 1950), British TV presenter, married name Smith